Nana Ann-Helene Hedin Pranschke, known as Nana Hedin and also known as Na Na and Nana d'Aquini (born May 24, 1968 in Eskilstuna, Södermanland, Sweden), is a Swedish singer.

Career 
NaNa Hedin started her career in the late 1980s, and worked primarily at the Cheiron Studios in Stockholm along with the Cheiron producers Denniz Pop, Max Martin, Kristian Lundin, etc. She recorded backup vocals for many artists such as Celine Dion, Britney Spears, Gary Barlow, Ace of Base, Aqua, and many others.

Hedin also recorded lead vocals for other Swedish artists such as Dr. Alban ("Look Who's Talking"), Stakka Bo ("Here We Go" and the whole Supermarket album released in 1993), Amadin ("Alrabaiye") or Flexx ("Wake Up").

In 2000, Hedin released her own single "Fame 2000" as NaNa D'Aquini under the Danish label Merlin / Playground Scandinavia. It was a cover and remix of the 1980s hit "Fame" by Irene Cara. A music video was shot in Las Vegas and the song was remixed by several DJs worldwide.

In 2005, she entered Melodifestivalen 2005 with the song "Wherever You Go".

Hedin also performed as a 'Primadonna' in theaters and tours between 1993 and 2003 with Swedish stand-up comedian/author Jonas Gardell.

With E-Type 
Hedin is mostly known for singing the chorus on most of E-Type's albums between 1994 and 2004, including the hits Set the World on Fire (1994), This Is the Way (1994), Angels Crying (1998), Here I Go Again (1998), and many more. Their last collaboration was for the song Paradise in 2004, which was used to enter Melodifestivalen 2004.

Most of the time, Dilnarin "Dee" Demirbag was on stage and in music videos with E-Type, lip-synching to Hedin's voice. Hedin can be seen in the music videos of "Set the World on Fire" (both versions), "Life" and "Paradise".

Notable TV appearances 
Besides the Melodifestivalen appearances in 2004 and 2005, Hedin opened the Swedish Sport Awards in 2007 by singing Pink Floyd's The Great Gig in the Sky, in front of the Swedish King Carl XVI Gustaf of Sweden. It was aired live on SVT from the Globen Arena.

In September 2007, Hedin participated in the musical game show Doobidoo on SVT, and paired up with Janne Carlsson against Ingela "Pling" Forsman & Jan Johansen. She performed Jimi Hendrix's Little Wing, with Carlsson on the drums.

On May 2, 2008, Hedin participated in the music program Så ska det låta. She paired up with Fred Johansson against Sarah Dawn Finer and Patrik Isaksson.

Awards 
On June 6, 2018, Hedin received the MVP (Most Valuable Person) Award at the Denniz PoP Awards by a jury consisting of major producers and artists such as Carly Rae Jepsen, Tove Lo, Rami Yacoub and Max Martin. Fans from all over the world voted for her, and she was picked for her behind-the-scenes contribution, helping to form the classic Cheiron sound. Producer and jury member Jacob Schulze says "Without Nana, the Cheiron sound wouldn't have sounded like it did. She's been an invaluable part of the Cheiron story and deserves this prize more than anyone else."

Cancer 
In August 2009, Hedin was diagnosed with Tongue cancer after being wrongly diagnosed by several specialist in 2008. The tumor was in stage 4 when rightly diagnosed and Hedin finally got help. The tumor was life threatening at that time, she did survive but due to the massive radiotherapy treatment the singer was given, she has not performed ever since. In 2014, she started suffering from Osteoradionecrosis, jawbone death, because of the radiotherapy. The Swedish surgeons said that they would have to resect the complete mandible and that she would never be able to sing again. Hedin started a world wide search for second opinions to try and find a better surgery to save her voice. In 2022 M.A.S- a Swedish non-profit organization started a fundraiser on GoFundMe named "Save NaNa's Voice 2022" in order to finance Hedins journey to India for reconstructive jaw surgery.
Hedins fans all over the world helped to donate and the fundraising is on going.

Discography
 FAME 2000 (single)
 It's Raining Men (2004) (single)
 Wherever You Go (2005) (single)

Featurings 
 Five
 Slam Dunk Da Funk
 Five 1998
 A*Teens
 Half Way Around the World 2001
 Ace of Base
 Flowers (album) 1998
 Life is a Flower Amadin
 Take Me Up (Alrabaiye) 1993
 Ardis Fagerholm
 Love Addict (album) 1994
 Aqua
 Aquarius (album) 2000
 Cartoon Heroes 2000
 Around The World 2000
 We Belong to the Sea 2000
 Back From Mars Freaky Friday Good Guys Goodbye to the Circus  Halloween Britney Spears
 Baby One More Time Oops!...I Did It Again (You Drive Me) Crazy Born to Make You Happy Stronger Bombastic Love Don't Go Knockin' On My Door Baby One More Time (album) 1999
 Oops!...I Did It Again (album) 2000
 Britney (album) 2001
 Céline Dion
 That's The Way It Is I'm Alive New Day Has Come (album) 2002
 One Heart (album) 2003
 On ne change pas 2005
 The Greatest Reward Coulda Woulda Shoulda Tous Les Secrets Dana Dragomir
 PanDana (album) 1995
 DJ Bobo
 World in Motion (album) 1996
 For Now And Forever Dr. Alban
 Look Who's Talking 1994
 Away From Home 1994
 Let The Beat Go On 1994
 E-Type
 Made in Sweden (album) 1994
 Do You Always Me No Want Miseria Set the World on Fire This is the Way Fight It Back Until the End Will I See You Again The Explorer (album) 1996
 Calling Your Name Back in the Loop I Just Wanna Be With You Free Like a Flying Demon Forever Wild I'm Not Alone Last Man Standing (album) 1998
 Angels Crying Here I Go Again Hold Your Horses I'm Flying Morning Light I'll Find A Way So Far Away Euro IV Ever (album) 2001
 Life Africa Arabian Star When I Close My Eyes Time No More Tears Loud Pipes Save Lives (album) 2004
 Paradise Far Up in the Air Forever More Elephant & Castle
 DJ Keep This Feeling Flexx
 Wake Up 1993
 GarouPiece of my soul ( album ) 2008
Back for more
 Gary Barlow
 SuperHero For All That You Want Twelve Months Eleven Days (album)
 Herbie
 I Believe 1995
 Papa Dee
 First Cut is The Deepest Just Let the Music The Journey (album) 1995
 The Tide is High Luciano Pavarotti & Friends
 Pavarotti & Friends for Cambodia & Tibet Safe
 Love is All We Need 1995
 Stakka Bo
 Down the Drain 1993
 Here We Go 1993
 Living it Up Supermarket'' (album) 1993

External links
Official website

References 

1968 births
Living people
People from Eskilstuna
Swedish women singers
Melodifestivalen contestants of 2005
Melodifestivalen contestants of 2004